Seh Chah (also Romanized as Seh Chāh) is a village in Jazmurian Rural District, Jazmurian District, Rudbar-e Jonubi County, Kerman Province, Iran. At the 2006 census, its population was 371, in 67 families.

References 

Populated places in Rudbar-e Jonubi County